Flums railway station is a railway station in Flums, in the Swiss canton of St. Gallen. It is an intermediate stop on the Ziegelbrücke–Sargans line.

Services 
Flums is served by the S4 of the St. Gallen S-Bahn:

 : hourly service via St. Gallen (circular operation).

Layout and connections 
Flums has a single -long island platform with two tracks ( 3–4). There is a non-passenger side platform located on the west side of the station. PostAuto Schweiz and  operate bus services from the station to Flumserberg, Walenstadt, Mels, and Sargans.

References

External links 
 
 

Railway stations in the canton of St. Gallen
Swiss Federal Railways stations